Automated lane keeping systems (ALKS), also described as traffic jam chauffeur, is an autonomous driving system that doesn't require driver supervision on motorways. ALKS is an international standard set out in UN-ECE regulation 157 and amounts to Level 3 vehicle automation. It is essentially a more robust combination of adaptive cruise control (ACC) and lane centering assist (LCA). When activated, it allows the driver to do non-driving tasks until alerted otherwise.

History 
In 2021, Mercedes-Benz has received German approval for an ALKS self-driving technology complying with UN-R157 legal requirements.

The regulation was signed by 54 states on 22 January 2021.

Entry into force in the European Union is 22 January 2022 for cars.

Entry into force is planned for June 2022 for heavy vehicles.

Regulation 
In all contracting countries, the date of entry into force of UNECE regulation 157 is 22 January 2021.

Requirements 
ALKS requires multiple criteria:

 driver seated, attached and available;
 proper functioning of the Data Storage System for Automated Driving (DSSAD);
 motorway type lane: road prohibited to pedestrians and cyclists equipped with a physical separation between the two directions of traffic;
 other weather conditions.

Collision avoidance features 

ALKS deals with some cases of collision avoidance.

ALKS defines some concepts:

References 

Advanced driver assistance systems